Finlay is a given name and a family name. 

Finlay may also refer to:
15P/Finlay, Comet Finlay
Finlay (band), a British indie rock band from London
Dave Finlay, an Irish born professional wrestler.
Finlay & Co., a British manufacturer of upmarket sunglasses.

See also 
Findlay (disambiguation)
Finley (disambiguation)
 Finlay River